Bedale High School is a coeducational, community school situated on Fitzalan Road, Bedale, North Yorkshire, England.

The School's 2004 Ofsted Inspection Report rated the school for overall effectiveness as Grade 2 (good); in 2007 again as Grade 2; and in 2010, as Grade 3 (satisfactory). In 2019, it was awarded a Grade 2 (good) rating.

In 2001, just before the 2001 General Election, Jonathan Dimbleby hosted a live broadcast of Any Questions? from the school. In 2017, the police were called to a disturbance on the school playing field. The protest by students was in regard to a restriction on toilet breaks, which one parent described as "humiliating". The police stated it was not a criminal matter.

Notable pupils
Micael Duff, football manager
Shane Duff, footballer
Paul Grayson, cricketer
Simon Grayson, football manager

References

Secondary schools in North Yorkshire
Community schools in North Yorkshire
Bedale
Educational institutions with year of establishment missing